Conservative Future Scotland (CFS) was the youth wing of the Scottish Conservative Party.

The organisation formed in early 2005 by the merger of the Scottish Young Conservatives and the Scottish Conservative and Unionist Students (SCUS) group, a process which had happened with its sister organisation in the rest of the United Kingdom - Conservative Future - in 1998. Its membership comprised all of the Scottish Conservative Party's members under the age of 30 or who were currently in higher education. The organisation formed itself into three regions, each with its own executive. Within the regions University Conservative and Unionist Associations and area Conservative Future branches organised at the local level.

CFS was the independent sister organisation of Conservative Future, the former central Conservative Party body that operated in the rest of the UK.

The Scottish Conservative Party itself, following the 2017 General Election, has 13 Westminster MPs in Scotland

National Officers 

National Chairman - James Bundy

Regional Chairpersons 

North of Scotland Chair - Cllr Struan Mackie
West of Scotland Chair - Cllr Meghan Gallacher
East of Scotland Chair - Position Vacant

Non-Voting Members 

Policy Forum Co-Director - Robert Weir

East of Scotland

East of Scotland Regional Officers 

East of Scotland Chairman - Position Vacant

Branches

Universities 

 Dundee University Conservative and Unionist Association (DUCUA)
 Edinburgh University Conservative and Unionist Association (EUCUA)
 St Andrews University Conservative Association (STAUCA)
 University of Stirling Conservative Association

West of Scotland

West of Scotland Regional Officers 

West of Scotland Chair - Meghan Gallacher

Branches

Universities 

 Glasgow University Conservative and Unionist Association (GUCUA)
 University of Strathclyde Conservative and Unionist Association

North of Scotland

North of Scotland Regional Officers 

North of Scotland Chairman -  Struan Mackie

Branches

Universities 

 Aberdeen University Conservatives
 Robert Gordon University Conservative and Unionist Association (RGUCUA)

References
The Young Tory Renaissance, The Sunday Times, October 2006
 Let's Get This Party Restarted, The Herald Magazine, 24 May 2009
Footnotes

External links
 Conservative Future Scotland Official website

2005 establishments in Scotland
Organizations established in 2005
Scottish Conservative Party
Conservative Future
Organisations based in Edinburgh
Youth wings of political parties in Scotland
Youth wings of Alliance of Conservatives and Reformists in Europe member parties
International Young Democrat Union